The Christian Democratic Union  of Lebanon is a centre-right party that is headed by Lebanese MP Neemtallah Abi Nasr. and part of March 8 Alliance.

References

Christian democratic parties in Asia
Christian political parties in Lebanon
March 8 Alliance
Political parties in Lebanon
Political parties with year of establishment missing